Mokrino is a village in the municipality of Novo Selo, North Macedonia. It is located close to the Greek and Bulgarian borders.

Demographics
According to the 2002 census, the village had a total of 748 inhabitants. Ethnic groups in the village include:

Macedonians 747
Others 1

References

Villages in Novo Selo Municipality